Osei Kwadwo was an Ashanti king who ruled from c. 1764 to 1777. He was succeeded by Osei Kwame Panyin.

See also
List of rulers of Asante

References
Adu Boahen. "A New Look at the History of Ghana." African Affairs, Vol. 65, No. 260 (Jul., 1966), pp. 212–222

18th-century Ghanaian people
18th-century monarchs in Africa
Ghanaian royalty
Year of death unknown
Year of birth unknown